Following is a list of senators of Gard, people who have represented the department of Gard in the Senate of France.

Third Republic

Senators for Gard under the French Third Republic were:

 Jacques Bonnefoy-Sibour (1876)
 Louis Laget (1876–1882)
 Pierre Meinadier (1876–1894)
 Ferdinand Gazagne (1879–1885)
 Louis-Edmond Claris (1885–1894)
 Auguste Dide (1885–1894)
 Alfred Silhol (1894–1903)
 Frédéric Desmons (1894–1910)
 Georges Bonnefoy-Sibour (1894–1918)
 Fernand Crémieux (1903–1928)
 Gaston Doumergue (1910–1924)
 Jean Cazelles (1920–1924)
 Louis Méjean (1924–1931)
 Georges Bruguier (1924–1945)
 Jean Bosc (1929–1939)
 Gaston Bazile (1931–1945)
 Louis Mourier (1939–1945)

Fourth Republic

Senators for Gard under the French Fourth Republic were:

 Fernand Jarrié (1946–1948)
 Léon Vergnole (1946–1948)
 Suzanne Crémieux (1948–1955)
 Edgar Tailhades (1948–1959)
 Paul Béchard (1955–1958)

Fifth Republic 
Senators for Gard under the French Fifth Republic:

References

Sources

 
Lists of members of the Senate (France) by department